Events from 2016 in England

Incumbent

Events

January
2 January – Rail fares in England, Scotland and Wales rise by 1.1%, in line with current inflation rates.
12 January – Junior doctors in England providing non-emergency care strike for 24 hours in a dispute with Health Secretary Jeremy Hunt over pay and working hours.
13 January – MPs have given initial support to the idea of England adopting an official national anthem.
14 January – 
The gang of "brazen burglars" involved in the £14m Hatton Garden jewellery heist, dubbed the "largest burglary in English legal history", face jail after the final three are convicted of involvement.
The Metropolitan Police announce that an extra 600 armed officers are to be trained and patrols more than doubled to help counter the threat of a terrorist attack in London.
15 January – Tim Peake conducts the first spacewalk by an "official" British astronaut, stepping outside an ISS airlock.
20 January – Unemployment rates fall to 5.1%, their lowest level in almost a decade, but figures show that wage growth has slowed.

March
22 March – Transgender fell-runner Lauren Jeska attempts to murder UK Athletics official Ralph Knibbs, stabbing him multiple times in Birmingham. Jeska had feared her records and ability to compete in women's events would be investigated due to the unfair advantage she had from being born male.

Deaths

14 January – Alan Rickman, actor and director (born 1946)
31 January – Terry Wogan, Irish radio and television broadcaster (born 1938 in Ireland)

See also
2016 in Northern Ireland
2016 in Scotland
2016 in Wales

References

 
England
2010s in England
Years of the 21st century in England